Jack may refer to:

Places
 Jack, Alabama, US, an unincorporated community
 Jack, Missouri, US, an unincorporated community 
 Jack County, Texas, a county in Texas, USA

People and fictional characters
 Jack (given name), a male given name, including a list of people and fictional characters with the name
 Jack (surname), including a list of people with the surname
 Jack (Tekken), multiple fictional characters in the fighting game series Tekken
 Jack the Ripper, an unidentified British serial killer active in 1888
 Wolfman Jack (1938–1995), a stage name of American disk jockey Robert Weston Smith
 New Jack, a stage name of Jerome Young (1963-2021), an American professional wrestler
 Spring-heeled Jack, a creature in Victorian-era English folklore

Animals and plants

Fish
Carangidae generally, including:
Almaco jack
Amberjack
Bar jack
Black jack (fish)
Crevalle jack
Giant trevally or ronin jack
Jack mackerel
Leather jack
Yellow jack
Coho salmon, males called "jacks"
Esox (northern pike), young called "jacks"
"Jackfish" or "jack", a western Canadian name for northern pike

Mammals
 Jack (baboon), a baboon who was the assistant to a disabled railway signalman in South Africa
 Jack (cat), a Norwegian forest cat who was lost by American Airlines baggage handlers
 Jack or jackass, a male donkey (Equus africanus)

Plants 
 Jack (tree) (Mangifera caesia), a relative of the mango
 Jack pine (Pinus banksiana), a North American conifer
 Jackfruit (Artocarpus heterophyllus)

Arts, entertainment, and media

Films
 Jack (1996 film), a film starring Robin Williams
 Jack (2004 film), a film starring Anton Yelchin and Stockard Channing
 Jack (2013 film), a television film starring Rick Roberts and Sook-Yin Lee
 Jack (2014 film), a German film
 Jack (2015 film), an Austrian film

Games 
 Jack (playing card), the lowest-ranking face card in some types of deck
 Jack, a target ball used in games such as bowls
 Jack, a playing piece used in the children's game called jacks

Literature
 Jack (Homes novel), a 1990 novel by A. M. Homes
 Jack (Lundell novel), a 1976 novel by Ulf Lundell
 Jack (Robinson novel), a 2020 novel by Marilynne Robinson

Periodicals
 Jack (Italian magazine), an Italian-language technology magazine
 Jack (magazine), an English-language British lad mag

Music

Artists and groups
 Jack (band), a British independent pop group signed to the Too Pure label
 Jack & Jack, an American an American pop-rap duo
 Jack (Vietnamese singer) (born 1997), a Vietnamese pop star

Albums
 Jack (album), a 2010 studio album by John Farnham
 Jack (EP), a 1991 EP by Moose
 Jack, a 1984 album by Bone Orchard
 J.A.C.K., a 2013 studio album by Forever the Sickest Kids

Songs
 "Jack" (song), a 2013 song by Breach
 "Jack" (1980), a B-side song to "Tell The Children" by Sham 69 on the album Kings & Queens
 "Jack" (1984), a song and single by Bone Orchard
 "Jack" (2001), a song by Iced Earth from their album Horror Show (2001)
 "Jack" (1983), a song and single by Machinations (band) 	
 "Jack" (1983), a song and single by Mighty Gabby 
 "Jack", song by Pixie Lott from the Turn It Up (2009) album
 "The Jack", a song by AC/DC originally on the album T.N.T. (1975)

Television
 Jack (TV series), a 3D-animated series broadcast by TVOntario
 Jack TV, a general entertainment channel in the Philippines (cable)

Other uses in arts, entertainment, and media
 Jack (hero), an archetypal Cornish and English hero and stock character
 Jack FM, a radio format and brand

Military
 Jack (flag), a national maritime flag flown by warships, e.g.,
Union Jack
 Jack, the Allied code-name of the Japanese Mitsubishi J2M fighter of World War II

Technology

Computing and software
 Jack (CAD software), a 3-D ergonomics and human factors CAD package
 Jack (human modeling), a human modeling and simulation system
 JACK Audio Connection Kit, a computer sound server
 JACK Intelligent Agents, a multi-agent platform written in Java

Electrical interfaces
 Electrical connector, or "wall jack", a socket (often panel-mounted) intended to accept a plug
 Phone connector (audio), commonly known as "audio jack", or "jack plug", or "phone jack"
 Registered jack, a standardized telecommunication network interface for connecting voice and data equipment

Mechanical tools
 Jack (device), a device used to lift heavy objects
Jackscrew, a device used to support heavy objects at various heights
Pallet jack, a device with two forks used to lift and move pallets; the powered version is known as a forklift
Strand jack, used in construction and engineering, and is capable of lifting hundreds of tonnes
 Boot jack, a device for removing boots
 Jack plane, a tool for smoothing wood
 Roasting jack, a device for turning a spit

Other uses
 Jack (mascot), the mascot of Jack in the Box restaurants
 Cracker Jack and Cracker Jack'D, snack foods 
 Jack Daniel's, a Tennessee whiskey distillery, whose product is sometimes referred to as "Jack"
 Jack of plate or jack, a type of armor
 Jack's (store), a British Discount supermarket chain
 Monterey Jack, a variety of cheese
 Sailor, "jack" in obsolete usage
 Sailor Jack, he and his dog Bingo are the mascots for Cracker Jack snack food
 Yukon Jack (liqueur), a Canadian whisky with honey
 Jack Tar, term for a sailor

See also
 
 
 Hijacking (disambiguation)
 Jacking, a dance technique and music form that first became popular in the late 1980s
 Jacks (disambiguation)
 Jacksepticeye, an Irish Internet personality and Youtuber